Mexico participated at the 14th Pan American Games, held in Santo Domingo, the Dominican Republic, from 1 to 17 August 2003.

Medals

Gold

Men's 10,000 metres: Teodoro Vega
Men's 50 km walk: Germán Sánchez
Women's 400 metres: Ana Guevara
Women's 5000 metres: Adriana Fernández
Women's 10,000 metres: Adriana Fernández
Women's 20 km walk: Victoria Palacios

Men's singles: Daniel Falconi
Women's doubles: Iliana Lomeli and Adriana Pérez

Men's light heavyweight (81 kg): Ramiro Reducindo

Men's 10 m platform: Rommel Pacheco

Men's +80 kg: Víctor Estrada
Women's 57 kg: Iridia Salazar

Silver

Men's 5000 metres: José David Galván
Men's 20 km walk: Bernardo Segura
Women's 5000 metres: Nora Rocha
Women's 20 km walk: Rosario Sánchez
Women's high jump: Romary Rifka

Women's tournament: Mayra García and Hilda Gaxiola

Men's singles: Marcos Baeza

Men's bantamweight (54 kg): Abner Mares

Men's C-1 1000 m: José Romero
Men's C-2 500 m: Cristian Dehesa and José Romero

Men's 3 m springboard: Fernando Platas
Men's 10 m synchronized platform: Fernando Platas and Rommel Pacheco
Women's 3 m springboard synchronized: Laura Sánchez and Paola Espinosa
Women's 10 m synchronized platform: Laura Sánchez and Paola Espinosa

Jumping team: Antonio Chedraui, Federico Fernández, Santiago Lambre and Gerardo Tazzer
Dressage individual: Bernadette Pujals

Mixed Hobie 16: Armando Noriega and Pamela Noriega

Men's 58 kg: Oscar Francisco Salazar
Men's 80 kg: José Luis Ramírez

Women's 58 kg: Soraya Jiménez

Bronze

Men's 20 km walk: Alejandro López

Men's tournament: Mexico

Men's light flyweight (48 kg): Raúl Castañeda
Men's flyweight (51 kg): Raúl Hirales
Men's lightweight (60 kg): Francisco Javier Vargas
Men's light welterweight (64 kg): Juan de Dios Navarro
Men's welterweight (69 kg): Alfredo Angulo

Men's K-2 500 m: Manuel Cortina Martínez and Ricardo Reza
Men's C-1 500 m: Francisco Caputitla
Men's C-2 1000 m: Cristian Dehesa and José Romero

Dressage team: Omar Zayrik, Bernadette Pujals, Antonio Rivera and Joaquín Orth

Men's tournament: Mexico
Women's tournament: Mexico

Men's Kumite (74 kg): Tetsuo Alonso Murayama
Women's Kumite (+58 kg): Marta Embriz

Men's 68 kg: Erick Osorio
Women's 49 kg: Carmen Morales
Women's 67 kg: Marien Ramírez

Women's 63 kg: Luz Acosta

Results by event

Athletics

Track

Road

Field

Basketball

Men's tournament
Anthony Norwood
Adam Parada
David Meza
Horacio Llamas
Omar López
Ramsés Benítez
Víctor Mariscal
Omar Quintero
Víctor Ávila
Enrique Zúñiga
Jorge Rochín
David Crouse
Head coach:
Guillermo Vecchio

Boxing

Swimming

Men's competitions

Women's competitions

Triathlon

See also
Mexico at the 2002 Central American and Caribbean Games
Mexico at the 2004 Summer Olympics

References

Nations at the 2003 Pan American Games
P
2003